1966 in sports describes the year's events in world sport.

Alpine skiing
 FIS Alpine World Ski Championships –
 Men's combined champion: Jean-Claude Killy, France
 Women's combined champion: Marielle Goitschel, France

American football
 Orange Bowl (1965 season):
 The Alabama Crimson Tide won 39–28 over the Nebraska Cornhuskers to win the AP Poll national championship after the previous #1 ranked Michigan State Spartans lost in the Rose Bowl and the #2 ranked Arkansas Razorbacks lost in the Cotton Bowl. This was the first time the AP conducted its final rankings at the conclusion of the postseason bowl games.
 June 8: The AFL and NFL reach an agreement to merge as equals into one league under the NFL name, to take effect with the 1970 season.
 AFL Championship – Kansas City Chiefs won 31–7 over the Buffalo Bills to advance to Super Bowl I in Jan. 1967
 NFL Championship – Green Bay Packers won 34–27 over the Dallas Cowboys to advance to Super Bowl I in Jan. 1967
 Each of the two existing top-level professional leagues added a new team for the 1966 season. The Atlanta Falcons joined the NFL, and the Miami Dolphins joined the AFL.
 1966 NCAA University Division football season:
 November 19 – The top-ranked Notre Dame Fighting Irish and the second-ranked Michigan State Spartans play to a 10–10 tie; Notre Dame retains its No. 1 ranking in the polls and are later named AP ansd UPI national champions.

Artistic gymnastics
 World Artistic Gymnastics Championships
Men's all-around champion: Mikhail Voronin, USSR
Women's all-around champion: Věra Čáslavská, Czechoslovakia
Men's team competition champion: Japan
Women's team competition champion: Czechoslovakia

Association football

England
 FA Cup final – Everton win 3–2 against Sheffield Wednesday

International
 World Cup – England defeats Germany to win the 1966 World Cup Final.
 FIFA decide to give the right to host the 1974 FIFA World Cup, 1978 FIFA World Cup and 1982 Football World Cup to West Germany, Argentina and Spain respectively

Athletics
 July 17 – American runner Jim Ryun sets a new world record for the mile at 3:51.3
 August – 1966 Commonwealth Games held at Kingston, Jamaica
 September – 1966 European Championships in Athletics held at Budapest
 December – 1966 Asian Games held at Bangkok

Australian rules football
 Victorian Football League
 St Kilda wins the 70th VFL Premiership (St Kilda 10.14 (74) d Collingwood 10.13 (73))
 Brownlow Medal awarded to Ian Stewart (St Kilda)

Baseball
 Milwaukee Braves move to Atlanta, Georgia and become the Atlanta Braves.
 January 20 – The BBWAA elects Ted Williams to the Hall of Fame. Williams, the last batter to hit .400, receives 282 of a possible 302 votes.
 Roberto Clemente is the National League MVP.
 Frank Robinson is the American League MVP.
Sandy Koufax of the Los Angeles Dodgers is the Major League Baseball Cy Young Award
Tommie Agee of the Chicago White Sox is the American League MLB Rookie of the Year award 
Tommy Helms of the Cincinnati Red is the National League MLB Rookie of the Year award 
 Ted Williams is inducted into Baseball Hall of Fame.
 World Series – Baltimore Orioles win 4 games to 0 over the Los Angeles Dodgers. Series MVP: Frank Robinson, Baltimore
 College World Series – Ohio State defeats Oklahoma State 8–2 at Johnny Rosenblatt Stadium. Ohio State pitcher Steve Arlin is named tournament Most Outstanding Player

Basketball
 NCAA University Division Basketball Championship –
 Texas Western wins 72–65 over Kentucky
 NBA Finals –
 Boston Celtics won 4 games to 3 over the Los Angeles Lakers. This would be the last of the Celtics' record eight straight NBA titles.
 NBA MVP – Philadelphia 76ers center Wilt Chamberlain
 A first season of Basketball Bundesliga was held in Germany on October 1. 
 A first Basketball Super League of Turkey games was held on December 13, replace from three regional (Istanbul, Ankara and Izmir) basketball league were merger.
 An NBA club, Chicago Bulls was founded in Illinois, United States on January 16.

Boxing
 March 29, Muhammad Ali defeats George Chuvalo in a 15-round unanimous decision 
 April 25 at New York City, World Welterweight Champion Emile Griffith won a 15-round unanimous decision over Dick Tiger to also become the World Middleweight Champion.
 May 21 Muhammad Ali defeats Henry Cooper with a 6th-round TKO
 August 6 Muhammad Ali defeats Brian London with a 3rd-round KO
September 10 Muhammad Ali defeats Karl Mildenberger with a 12th-round TKO
 November 14, Muhammad Ali knocks out Cleveland Williams in three rounds to retain the WBC heavyweight title.

Canadian football
 Grey Cup – Saskatchewan Roughriders win 29–14 over the	Ottawa Rough Riders
 Vanier Cup – St. Francis Xavier X-Men win 40–14 over the Wilfrid Laurier Golden Hawks

Cycling
 Giro d'Italia won by Gianni Motta of Italy
 Tour de France – Lucien Aimar of France
 Vuelta a España – Francisco Gabica of Spain
 UCI Road World Championships – Men's road race – Rudi Altig of Germany

Figure skating
 World Figure Skating Championships –
  Men's champion: Emmerich Dänzer, Austria
 Ladies' champion: Peggy Fleming, United States
 Pair skating champions: Ludmila Belousova & Oleg Protopopov, Soviet Union
 Ice dancing champions: Diane Towler & Bernard Ford, Great Britain

Golf
 July 24 – Tony Lema (32), American golf champion, died in an air crash at Munster, Indiana
Men's professional
 Masters Tournament – Jack Nicklaus
 U.S. Open – Billy Casper
 British Open – Jack Nicklaus becomes the fourth player to win all four major professional championships.
 PGA Championship – Al Geiberger
 PGA Tour money leader – Billy Casper – $121,945
Men's amateur
 British Amateur – Bobby Cole
 U.S. Amateur – Gary Cowan
Women's professional
 Women's Western Open – Mickey Wright
 LPGA Championship – Gloria Ehret
 U.S. Women's Open – Sandra Spuzich
 Titleholders Championship – Kathy Whitworth
 LPGA Tour money leader – Kathy Whitworth – $33,517

Harness racing
 Romeo Hanover wins the United States Pacing Triple Crown races –
 Cane Pace – Romeo Hanover
 Little Brown Jug – Romeo Hanover
 Messenger Stakes – Romeo Hanover
 United States Trotting Triple Crown races –
 Hambletonian – Kerry Way
 Yonkers Trot – Polaris
 Kentucky Futurity – Governor Armbro
 Australian Inter Dominion Harness Racing Championship –
 Pacers: Chamfer Star
 Trotters: Yamamoto

Horse racing
Steeplechases
 Cheltenham Gold Cup – Arkle
 Grand National – Anglo
Flat races
 Australia – Melbourne Cup won by Galilee
 Canada – Queen's Plate won by Titled Hero
 France – Prix de l'Arc de Triomphe won by Bon Mot
 Ireland – Irish Derby Stakes won by Sodium
 English Triple Crown Races:
 2,000 Guineas Stakes – Kashmir
 The Derby – Charlottown
 St. Leger Stakes – Sodium
 United States Triple Crown Races:
 Kentucky Derby – Kauai King
 Preakness Stakes – Kauai King
 Belmont Stakes – Amberoid

Ice hockey
 Art Ross Trophy as the NHL's leading scorer during the regular season: Bobby Hull, Chicago Black Hawks
 Hart Memorial Trophy – for the NHL's Most Valuable Player: Bobby Hull, Chicago Black Hawks
 Stanley Cup – Montreal Canadiens won 4–2 over the Detroit Red Wings
 World Hockey Championship
 Men's champion: Soviet Union defeated Czechoslovakia
 NCAA Men's Ice Hockey Championship – Michigan State University Spartans defeat Clarkson University Golden Knights 6–1 in Minneapolis

Motorsport

Orienteering
 First Orienteering World Championships held 1–2 October in Fiskars, Finland.

Rugby league
1966 New Zealand rugby league season
1966 NSWRFL season
1965–66 Northern Rugby Football League season / 1966–67 Northern Rugby Football League season

Rugby union
 72nd Five Nations Championship series is won by Wales

Snooker
 World Snooker Championship challenge match: John Pulman beats Fred Davis 5–2 in matches.

Speed skating
 January 4 – death of Inga Artamonova (29), Russian world speed-skating champion, who was murdered by her husband

Tennis
Australia
 Australian Men's Singles Championship – Roy Emerson (Australia) defeats Arthur Ashe (USA) 6–4, 6–8, 6–2, 6–3
 Australian Women's Singles Championship – Margaret Smith Court (Australia) defeats Nancy Richey (USA) walkover
England
 Wimbledon Men's Singles Championship – Manuel Santana (Spain) defeats Dennis Ralston (USA) 6–4, 11–9, 6–4
 Wimbledon Women's Singles Championship – Billie Jean King (USA) defeats Maria Bueno (Brazil) 6–3, 3–6, 6–1
France
 French Men's Singles Championship – Tony Roche (Australia) defeats István Gulyás (Hungary) 6–1, 6–4, 7–5
 French Women's Singles Championship – Ann Haydon Jones (Great Britain) defeats Nancy Richey (USA) 6–3, 6–1
USA
 American Men's Singles Championship – Tournament did not start until 1968
 American Women's Singles Championship – Tournament did not start until 1968
Davis Cup
 1966 Davis Cup –  4–1  at Kooyong Stadium (grass) Melbourne, Australia

Volleyball
 1966 FIVB Men's World Championship in Prague won by Czechoslovakia

Multi-sport events
 Asian Games held in Bangkok, Thailand
 1966 British Empire and Commonwealth Games held in Kingston, Jamaica
 Central American and Caribbean Games held in San Juan, Puerto Rico
 Fourth Winter Universiade held in Sestriere, Italy

Awards
 Associated Press Male Athlete of the Year – Frank Robinson, Major League Baseball
 Associated Press Female Athlete of the Year – Kathy Whitworth, LPGA golf
 Sports Illustrated Sportsman of the Year - Jim Ryun, running

References

 
Sports by year